Monique Rossi (16 December 1937 – 24 August 2018) was a French gymnast. She competed in six events at the 1960 Summer Olympics.

References

External links
 

1937 births
2018 deaths
French female artistic gymnasts
Olympic gymnasts of France
Gymnasts at the 1960 Summer Olympics
People from Montceau-les-Mines
Sportspeople from Saône-et-Loire
20th-century French women